Arshak Rafaelyevich Koryan (born 17 June 1995) is an Armenian professional footballer who plays as a right winger for Alania Vladikavkaz on loan from Khimki.

Club career
Born in Sochi, Koryan started his career at FC Lokomotiv Moscow. After progressing through the club's youth system, he was an unused substitute in a 0–1 away loss against PFC CSKA Moscow.

On 3 February 2015, Koryan signed for Dutch Eredivisie club Vitesse, being initially assigned to Jong Vitesse. On 21 May, he renewed his contract for a further year. On 8 June 2016, Koryan was promoted to the main squad and was assigned the  30 shirt. He made his professional debut on 6 August, replacing Mitchell van Bergen in the 81st minute of a 4–1 away win against Willem II. On 31 March 2017, it was announced that Koryan would leave Vitesse along with Wouter Dronkers and Ewout Gouw at the end of their current deals in June 2017.

On 12 July 2017, Koryan returned to FC Lokomotiv Moscow as a free agent. He left Lokomotiv upon the expiration of his contract on 30 June 2019.

On 1 July 2019, he signed with Khimki. On 4 March 2021, he extended his contract with Khimki.

On 13 August 2021, he joined FC Orenburg on loan for the 2021–22 season.

On 19 August 2022, Koryan was loaned to Alania Vladikavkaz.

International career
He represented Russia on junior levels. Before the 2020–21 Russian Premier League season, the players from the countries that belong to Eurasian Economic Union (of which Armenia is one), stopped being considered foreign players in Russian leagues (there are restrictions on the number of foreign players per team). He made his debut for Armenia national football team on 5 September 2020 in a UEFA Nations League 1–2 loss against North Macedonia.

Personal life
Koryan is the cousin of the Russian youth international Ruslan Koryan.

Career statistics

Honours

Club
Vitesse
KNVB Cup: 2016–17

Lokomotiv Moscow
Russian Premier League: 2017–18

References

External links
Profile at Vitesse official website 

1995 births
Sportspeople from Sochi
Russian people of Armenian descent
Citizens of Armenia through descent
Living people
Russian footballers
Russia youth international footballers
Russia under-21 international footballers
Armenian footballers
Armenia youth international footballers
Armenia international footballers
Association football wingers
FC Lokomotiv Moscow players
SBV Vitesse players
FC Khimki players
FC Orenburg players
Russian Premier League players
Eredivisie players
Russian First League players
Russian expatriate footballers
Expatriate footballers in the Netherlands
Russian expatriate sportspeople in the Netherlands